Griffith Bodwrda (1621–1677) was a Welsh politician who sat in the House of Commons at various times between 1656 and 1660.

Bodwrda was the son of Hugh Bodwrda of Bodwrda Carnarvonshire. Before 1646 he was granted the Wine Licence Office which had an income of £300 pa. He was also appointed Receiver of the First Fruits worth £200 pa and was Keeper of the Records of the Court of Common Pleas in 1656. In 1656 Bodwrda was elected Member of Parliament for Anglesey in the Second Protectorate Parliament. He was elected MP for Beaumaris in 1659 for the Third Protectorate Parliament.

In 1660, Bodwrda was re-elected MP for Beaumaris in the Convention Parliament. In October 1660 he was ordered by King Charles II to see to the dismantling of Carnarvon Castle and in 1666 he was charged with providing protection to refugees from the Great Fire of London who were displaced to Islington.

References

 

1621 births
1677 deaths
Members of the Parliament of England (pre-1707) for constituencies in Wales
People from Anglesey
17th-century Welsh politicians
English MPs 1656–1658
English MPs 1659
English MPs 1660
Members of the Parliament of England for Beaumaris